Chaos & Colour is the 25th studio album by British rock band Uriah Heep, released in January 2023 by Silver Lining Music. It was produced by Jay Ruston.

Track listing

Personnel 
Uriah Heep
 Mick Box – guitar, backing vocals
 Phil Lanzon – keyboards, backing vocals
 Bernie Shaw – lead vocals
 Russell Gilbrook – drums, percussion
 Dave Rimmer – bass guitar, backing vocals

Production
Jay Ruston – producer, engineer

Charts

References 

Uriah Heep (band) albums
2023 albums